Elisabeth Winkelmeier-Becker ( Winkelmeier, born 15 September 1962) is a German lawyer and politician of the Christian Democratic Union (CDU) who has been serving as a member of the Bundestag from Rhein-Sieg-Kreis I in the state of North Rhine-Westphalia since 2005. 

From 2019 to 2021, Winkelmeiner-Becker also served Parliamentary State Secretary at the Federal Ministry of Economic Affairs and Energy under Minister Peter Altmaier in the government of Chancellor Angela Merkel.

Political career 
Winkelmeier-Becker first became a member of the Bundestag in the 2005 German federal election. In parliament, she has served on the Committee on Legal Affairs and Consumer Protection (2005–2019); the Committee on Family Affairs, Senior Citizens, Women and Youth (2005–2013); and the Parliamentary Advisory Board on Sustainable Development (2005–2009).

In the negotiations to form a Grand Coalition of Chancellor Angela Merkel's Christian Democrats (CDU together with the Bavarian CSU) and the SPD following the 2013 federal elections, Winkelmeier-Becker was part of the CDU/CSU delegation in the working group on families, women and equality, led by Annette Widmann-Mauz and Manuela Schwesig. In similar negotiations following the 2017 federal elections, she was part of the working group on internal and legal affairs, led by Thomas de Maizière, Stephan Mayer and Heiko Maas.
 
In 2018, Winkelmeier-Becker joined the parliamentary body in charge of appointing judges to the Highest Courts of Justice, namely the Federal Court of Justice (BGH), the Federal Administrative Court (BVerwG), the Federal Fiscal Court (BFH), the Federal Labour Court (BAG), and the Federal Social Court (BSG).

From 2019 to 2021, Winkelmeier-Becker served as Parliamentary State Secretary for Economic Affairs and Energy. In this capacity, she was also the ministry's Special Coordinator for the Extractive Industries Transparency Initiative (EITI).

Following the 2021 elections, Winkelmeier-Becker became the chairwoman of the Committee on Legal Affairs.

In the negotiations to form a coalition government under the leadership of Minister-President of North Rhine-Westphalia Hendrik Wüst following the 2022 state elections, Winkelmeier-Becker was part of her party’s delegation.

Other activities

Corporate boards 
 Deutsche Bahn, Member of the Supervisory Board (2020–2022)
 German Investment Corporation (DEG), ex-officio Member of the Supervisory Board (2018–2021)

Non-profit organizations 
 German Foundation for International Legal Cooperation (IRZ), Member of the Board of Trustees (since 2022)
 Magnus Hirschfeld Foundation, Alternate Member of the Board of Trustees (since 2022)
 Haus der Geschichte, Member of the Board of Trustees (since 2022)

Political Sponsorship 
On Dec 15, 2022, Mrs Winkelmeier-Becker declared that she politically supports Eshragh Najafabadi, an Iranian athlete seized by IRGC suppression forces during Mahsa Amini protests.

Political positions
In June 2017, Winkelmeier-Becker abstained from a parliamentary vote on Germany's introduction of same-sex marriage.

In 2019, Winkelmeier-Becker joined 14 members of her parliamentary group who, in an open letter, called for the party to rally around Merkel and party chairwoman Annegret Kramp-Karrenbauer amid criticism voiced by conservatives Friedrich Merz and Roland Koch.

References

External links 

  
 Bundestag biography 

1962 births
Living people
Members of the Bundestag for North Rhine-Westphalia
Female members of the Bundestag
21st-century German women politicians
Members of the Bundestag 2021–2025
Members of the Bundestag 2017–2021
Members of the Bundestag 2013–2017
Members of the Bundestag 2009–2013
Members of the Bundestag 2005–2009
Parliamentary State Secretaries of Germany
Members of the Bundestag for the Christian Democratic Union of Germany